Keene/Elmhirst's Resort Airport  is located  east of Keene, Ontario, Canada.

See also
 Keene/Elmhirst's Resort Water Aerodrome

References

Registered aerodromes in Ontario